Vladimir Ivanovich Yurin (18 May 1947 – 15 March 2016) was a Russian professional football coach and player.

Honours
 Soviet Top League champion: 1976 (autumn).
 Soviet Top League bronze: 1977.

References

External links
 Career summary by KLISF

1947 births
2016 deaths
Soviet footballers
FC Baltika Kaliningrad players
FC Torpedo Moscow players
Soviet football managers
Russian football managers
FC Tom Tomsk managers
FC Saturn Ramenskoye managers
FC Arsenal Tula managers

Association football midfielders